Wang Yongfeng (simplified Chinese: 王勇峰, pinyin: Wáng Yŏngfēng) (born 1963) is a Chinese mountaineer  and the assistant secretary-general of  China mountain climbing association. He is also the captain of the Chinese Mountaineering Team. Wang and his partner, Li Zhixin (李致新), became the first Chinese couple to climb the "Seven Summits" on June 23, 1999.

Biography
Wang Yongfeng was born in Jining District, Inner Mongolia. He entered the Wuhan College of Geology in 1980. Wang and Li Zhixin became friends in this Institute and they were elected to the Wuhan Institute of Geology Mountaineering Team together in 1984. He started his mountaineering career from then on.
In 2008, the Beijing Olympic flame was brought to the top of Mt. Qomolangma, and Wang Yongfeng was the head of that mountaineering team as well as the second torchbearer on the peak.

References

1963 births
Chinese mountain climbers
Chinese summiters of Mount Everest
Summiters of the Seven Summits
Living people
Sportspeople from Inner Mongolia
People from Ulanqab